Julio Cepeda (born 20 December 1932) is a Mexican cyclist. He competed in the individual and team road race events at the 1952 Summer Olympics.

References

External links
 

1932 births
Living people
Mexican male cyclists
Olympic cyclists of Mexico
Cyclists at the 1952 Summer Olympics